The 2004 Maine Black Bears football team was an American football team that represented the University of Maine as a member of the Atlantic 10 Conference during the 2004 NCAA Division I-AA football season. In their 12th season under head coach Jack Cosgrove, the Black Bears compiled a 5–6 record (3–5 against conference opponents) and finished in a three-way tie for sixth place in the conference. Mike Leconte, Marcus Walton, and Marcus Williams were the team captains.

Schedule

References

Maine
Maine Black Bears football seasons
Maine Black Bears football